The terminology of the Armenian genocide is different in English, Turkish, and Armenian languages and has led to political controversies around the issue of Armenian genocide denial and Armenian genocide recognition. Although the majority of historians writing in English use the word "genocide", other terms exist.

Armenian

Yeghern and Medz Yeghern
Medz Yeghern (Mets yegherrn ) is an Armenian term for genocide, especially the Armenian genocide. Usage of the term has been the subject of political controversy because it is perceived as more ambiguous than the word genocide.  The term Հայոց ցեղասպանություն (Hayots tseghaspanutyun), literally "Armenian genocide", is also used in official contexts, for example, the Հայոց ցեղասպանության թանգարան (Armenian Genocide Museum) in Armenia.

English

Contemporary observers used unambiguous terminology to describe the genocide, including "the murder of a nation", "race extermination" and so forth.

Crime against humanity

In their declaration of May 1915, the Entente powers called the ongoing deportation of Armenian people a "crime against humanity". Crimes against humanity later became a category in international law following the Nuremberg trials.

Genocide
The English word genocide was coined by the Polish Jewish lawyer Raphael Lemkin in 1943. Lemkin's interest in war crimes stemmed from the 1921 trial of Soghomon Tehlirian for the assassination of Talaat Pasha; he recognized the fate of the Armenians as one of the main cases of genocide in the twentieth century. Although most international law scholars agree that the 1948 Genocide Convention, which established the prohibition of genocide in international criminal law, is not retroactive, the events of the Armenian genocide otherwise meet the legal definition of genocide. David Gutman states that "few if any scholars, however, reject the use of 'genocide for the Armenian case solely because they consider it anachronistic. However, it is possible to write about the Armenian genocide without downplaying or denying it, using a variety of terms other than genocide.

As well as having a legal meaning, the word genocide also "contains an inherent value judgment, one that privileges the morality of the victims over the perpetrators".

Ethnic cleansing
The term ethnic cleansing, which was invented during the 1990s Yugoslav Wars, is often used alongside or instead of genocide in academic works. Some Turkish historians are willing to call the Armenian Genocide ethnic cleansing or a crime against humanity but hesitate at genocide.

French
The names in French are Génocide arménien and génocide des Arméniens.

German
, the German word for genocide, predates the English word and was used by German contemporaries to describe the genocide.

Turkish

The Turkish government uses expressions such as "so-called Armenian genocide", "the ", often characterizing the charge of genocide as "Armenian allegations" or "Armenian lies". Turkish historian Doğan Gürpınar writes that  is "the peculiar idiom to reluctantly refer to 1915 but outright reject it", invented in the early 1980s to further Armenian genocide denial. However, in 2006, Prime Minister Recep Tayyip Erdoğan ordered government officials to say "the events of 1915" instead of "so-called Armenian genocide". Erdoğan, as well as some Turkish intellectuals, have distinguished between "good" Armenians (those who live in Turkey and Armenia) who do not discuss the genocide and "bad" ones (primarily the Armenian diaspora) who insist on recognition. 

Many Turkish intellectuals have been reluctant to use the term genocide because, according to Akçam, "by qualifying it a genocide you become a member of a collective associated to a crime, not any crime but to the ultimate crime". According to Halil Karaveli, "the word [genocide] incites strong, emotional reactions among Turks from all walks of society and of every ideological inclination".

References

Sources

Further reading

Aftermath of the Armenian genocide
Terminology by ideology
Historiography by war or conflict
Historiography of the Ottoman Empire
Historiography of World War I
Euphemisms